Sehid Sinani (born 23 October 1982 in Laufen) is a Swiss football defender of Macedonian Albanian descent.

He last played for FC Thun of the Swiss Super League.

External links
 

1982 births
Living people
Swiss men's footballers
FC Basel players
FC Thun players
Swiss people of Albanian descent
Swiss people of Macedonian descent
Association football defenders